The 1992 AFC Youth Championship was held from September 25 to October 10, 1992, in Dubai, United Arab Emirates. The tournament was won by for the second time by Saudi Arabia in the final against Korea Republic.

Group stage

Group A

Group B

Knockout stage

Semifinal

Third-place match

Final

Winner

 Saudi Arabia, Korea Republic qualified for 1993 FIFA World Youth Championship.

 
AFC U-19 Championship
International association football competitions hosted by the United Arab Emirates
Youth
1992–93 in Emirati football
1992 in youth association football